The Olympia Bob Run St. Moritz-Celerina is a bobsleigh track located in the Engadin Valley, Switzerland. It officially opened on New Year's Day 1904 and is the oldest bobsleigh track in the world. It is also the only one that is naturally refrigerated. It is used for other sliding sports, including skeleton and luge.

History
The track was initially created for winter guests from Great Britain who invented bobsleigh. In 1897, the St. Moritz Bobsleigh Club was created. Because of the popularity of the sport, fund raising for the track was completed in 1903 with CHF 11,000 raised. The track served as host to the bobsleigh events for both the 1928 and the 1948 Winter Olympics. Track modifications have been made several times since the 1948 games, especially in the lower part of the track to adapt on higher speeds of the sleds and the increased braking issues after the end of the run. The horse-shoe corner, constructed of natural stones, was strengthened and its height and radius increased during the winters of 1995 and 1996. This was also important with the addition of guest rides to the program in 1973. In 1972, the Dracula Start House (Starthaus Dracula ) was demolished and a new structure was created to meet the needs of the bobsleigh organizers with further renovations done in 1992, 1993, and 2002. The last additional modification took place in 2002 with the addition of a runoff after the Portago curve that lead to the Frizzoni's Finish lodge.

Current track turns and length

The track, with 19 curves, is 1,722 meters long with an elevation difference of 130 meters and an average grade of 8.14%. The curves were given most of their names by the British and remain to this day.

Track construction
The track is constructed out of ice-covered snow, and as such, the track is not exactly identical from year to year. The track construction begins around the middle of November and takes a crew of fifteen ice workers a total of three weeks to construct the track. Construction follows the entire length of the track from start to finish. Because it is a natural track, length and elevation changes occur annually during construction. Once construction is completed, the fifteen workers split up into respective sections to maintain their area during the season which is done every afternoon and can take up to four hours. Once the bobsleigh and skeleton season concludes in early March, track dismantling begins.

References

External links
IBSF information 
Olympia Bobrun (Official website) 
St. Moritz Bob Club History 
St. Moritz Celerina Olympic Bobrun 
St. Moritz-Celerina Olympic Bobrun on Google Maps

Venues of the 1928 Winter Olympics
Venues of the 1948 Winter Olympics
Bobsleigh, luge, and skeleton tracks
Olympic bobsleigh venues
Sports venues in Switzerland
Sport in St. Moritz
Buildings and structures in Graubünden
Bobsleigh in Switzerland
1904 establishments in Switzerland
Sports venues completed in 1904
20th-century architecture in Switzerland